IBM worker organizations have not historically been recognized by IBM. Since the company's foundation in 1911, it has not recognized any trade unions in the United States, despite the efforts by workers to establish them from 1970 onward. In Germany and Australia there are several trade unions recognized by IBM, with limited recognition.

In 1999, employees of IBM in Europe formed a European Works Council. In 2011, the global union federations UNI Global Union and International Metalworker's Federation formed the "IBM Global Union Alliance" to coordinate IBM-labour activities across the globe among its affiliate unions.

Australia 
In 2002, after IBM Global Services Australia and Community and Public Sector Union (CPSU) failed to negotiate a common enterprise agreement for all 3,500 employees working on the Telstra contract (about half were original Telstra staff covered by a different agreement), CPSU organized two 48 hour strike actions.

In April 2010 the Fair Work Australia tribunal ordered IBM Australia to bargain with the Australian Service Union representing employees in Baulkham Hills, Sydney. IBM in response, unsuccessfully appealed. About 80 employees accepted collectively negotiated contracts that addressed severance packages and sick leave.

China 
Over 1000 workers of an IBM factory in Shenzhen went on a wildcat strike in March 2014, after management announced the sale of the factory to Lenevo. The strike is part of a larger trend of labour militancy in the Guangdong province. Workers demanded higher severance packages if they left and higher salaries if they transferred to Lenevo.

Germany 
The German Trade Union Confederation (DGB) has the principle of one trade union per company, but in practice, both ver.di, and IG Metall have been competing since the early 1990s to represent individual IBM workers, have unionized members win seats in the Works Councils and have bargaining coverage through collective agreements. In December 2001, ver.di and IG Metall agreed to form a joint collective bargaining committee with IBM Deutschland to resolve their internal union competition.

In 1994, after internal organizational restructuring, 5 non-manufacturing subsidiaries of IBM Germany did not join Gesamtmetall, and instead concluded company specific collective agreements ("") between DAG and the newly formed subsidiaries, which differed, for example moving to the customized 38-hour work week. In the absence of sectoral collective agreements or high union-density, local works councils have an increased bargaining void over regulating issues like working time. A company collective agreements serves as a middle ground and removes some of the responsibility from the more legally restricted works council framework.

United States 
In August 1970 the IBM Black Workers Alliance (BWA) was formed, the first high-tech movement for under represented minorities, to protest lack of equal pay and promote opportunities for young, poor communities. Between 1978 and 1980 its membership grew five-fold to 1700 people. IBM responded by firing 4 of the top 8 BWA officers. BWA existed until the early 1990s and had chapters in Atlanta, New York City, Hudson Valley and Washington DC. They were not a union, nor trying to form one, but one member, Marceline Donaldson started organizing with the all Black Pullman Porters Union until she left in 1979. In 1980 Donaldson filed a complaint with the NLRB and the EEOC alleging unfair labor practices and retaliation against Black employees joining the BWA chapter in Cincinnati.

In the 1970s Lee Conrad founded the IBM Workers United (IBMWU) which was an independent grassroots union. It had an underground newsletter called "Resistor" which highlighted a number of issues, including IBM's sale of computers during South African Apartheid, comparing them to IBM's sale of computers to the Nazis. In the 1970s members of IBMWU distributed fliers at a shareholder meeting titled "Would IBM have Sold Computers to Hitler?" protesting IBM's trade deals with apartheid South Africa.

In 1999, IBMWU affiliated with the Communications Workers of America, rebranding as Alliance@IBM, CWA Local 1701, with Conrad as its lead coordinator. In 2016, Alliance@IBM shut down, citing low membership, outsourcing and union busting.

See also 
 International Labour Organization
 Labour movement
 List of federations of trade unions
 World Organization of Workers

Notes

References

External 
 Watching IBM – Official website of IBM@Alliance
IBM European Works Council database

IBM
Tech sector trade unions
IBM